Guava are a type of tropical fruit, commonly from the species Psidium guajava, the "common guava". Guava may also refer to:

Plants
Guava paste, see Goiabada
Feijoa sellowiana, pineapple guava
Myrciaria floribunda, guavaberry
 the genus Psidium, particularly:
Psidium cattleyanum, strawberry guava, cherry guava, yellow guava, purple guava
Psidium dumetorum, Jamaican guava, an extinct species
Psidium friedrichsthalianum, Costa Rican guava
Psidium guajava, common guava, apple guava
Psidium guineense, Brazilian guava
Psidium rufum, purple guava
Ugni molinae, Chilean guava

Animals
Guava skipper (Phocides polybius)
Guava bird, Norfolk Island thrush (Turdus poliocephalus poliocephalus)

Computing
Google Guava, an open-source collection of libraries for the Java platform

Geography
Guava River

Other
Pure Guava (album)